The Luni is the largest river in the Thar Desert of northwest India. It is first known as Sagarmati, then after passing Govindgarh, it meets its tributary Sarasvati, which originates from Pushkar Lake and from then on it is called Luni.

In 1892, Maharaja Jaswant Singh II of Jodhpur constructed Jaswant Sagar in Pichiyak village between Bilara and Bhawi of Jodhpur district. It is one of the internal drainage rivers in India; it does not meet with Arabian Sea. It is drained before it reaches the Arabian Sea.

Etymology
The Luni is also known as the Lavanavari or Lavanavati, which means "salt river" in Sanskrit, due to the high salinity of its water.

Overview
The Luni River basin is 37,363 km², which includes all or part of the Ajmer, Barmer, Jalore, Jodhpur, Nagaur, Pali and Sirohi districts of Rajasthan and the Banaskantha and Patan districts of northern Gujarat. Its major tributaries are the Sukri, Mithri, Bandi, Khari, Jawai, Guhiya and Sagi from the left and the Jojari from the right.

The Luni River begins near Ajmer in the Pushkar valley of the western Aravalli Range at an elevation of about 550m.  At this point, the river is also known as the Sagarmati.  The river then flows in the southwest direction through the hills and plains of the Marwar region in Rajasthan.  The river flows south-west and enters the Thar Desert before dissipating into the Rann of Kutch, traversing a total of 495 km. In spite of the high salinity, it is a major river in the region and serves as a primary source of irrigation.  The Luni is not saline until it reaches Balotra, where high salt content in the soil impacts the river.

The Luni may have been the southern portion of the historic Ghaggar-Hakra river channel.

Tributaries
The Jawai, Sukri, Guhiya, Bandi and Jojari rivers are the main tributaries of Luni river. The Jojari is the only tributary that merges to the right-bank of the river while other 10 tributaries reach its left bank. All the tributaries except Jojari originates from the Aravalli hill.

Dams and irrigation
The dams in Luni river are:
Dantiwada dam 
Sipu dam 
Jaswant Sagar Dam - built in 1892 by Maharaja Jaswant Singh.It is one of the largest artificial lakes in India.

The two major irrigation projects on Luni river are SardarSamand and Jawai dam.
Sardar Samand dam was constructed in 1905.

Flash floods
Flash floods have occurred in the Luni river as the river flows on a shallow bed and the riverbank soil is easily flattened by the rain water.

The worst flood happened in 2006, when the desert region received heavy rain. The water levels rose to 15–25 feet submerging the surrounding region. The 2006 flash floods caused water levels to rise to as high as 15–25 feet submerging many parts along the river in the Barmer district. A large number of people and animals died in the flood.

In 2010, another flood occurred but there were less casualties.

Fish diversity
The fish diversity assessment of Luni river led by ICAR-National Bureau of Fish Genetic Resources, Lucknow from October, 2018 - November, 2019 reported the occurrence of 27 species belonging to 22 genera, dominated by Cyprinids. The highest fish diversity of 12 species was reported in Samdhari and Gandhav. In this study, the wide distribution of Invasive Fish Species such as African Catfish (Clarias gariepinus) and Mozambique tilapia (Oreochromis mossambicus) were also reported from the river Luni.

References

Rivers of Rajasthan
Barmer district
Aravalli Range
Rivers of India